Jane Elizabeth Hutt MS (born 15 December 1949) is a Welsh Labour Party politician serving as Minister for Social Justice since 2021. She has served as the Member of the Senedd (MS) for the Vale of Glamorgan since 1999.

A member of the Parliament since its creation, Hutt holds the record for the longest serving Welsh Government minister and has served in every administration to date. She served continually in government from May 1999 until the November 2017 reshuffle, returning in December 2018. Hutt has held several of the most senior government offices, including Minister for Finance, Minister for Health and Social Services, and Minister for Education.

Early years
Born in Epsom, Surrey, on 15 December 1949, Hutt's Welsh-speaking grandparents are from North Wales, and her father was the pathologist Michael Hutt. Hutt was educated at Surbiton High School and graduated from the University of Kent, Canterbury in 1970 with a BA (Hons), gained a Certificate of Qualification in Social Work at the London School of Economics in 1972 and an M.Sc. at the University of Bristol in 1995.

Professional career
Hutt was one of the founder members of Welsh Women's Aid, a feminist organisation campaigning on behalf of women who are victims of domestic violence. She was appointed as a coordinator of the group in January 1978.

Hutt held non-political appointments as director of the equal opportunities' organisation Chwarae Teg and non-executive director of the Cardiff Community Health Care Trust. Member New Deal Task Force. School Governor. Welsh member on the New Opportunities (UK) Fund.

Political career
Hutt was a councillor on South Glamorgan County Council and a former vice-chair of the Social Services Committee. She unsuccessfully stood for election to the British Parliament in 1983 in Cardiff North.

Hutt was elected to the Senedd in 1999 and has been re-elected at every subsequent election. She served as a government minister for a total of 18 years, 5 months, 23 days (or 6,751 days) from 12 May 1999 to 3 November 2017 making her the then longest serving Labour Minister in UK history. Her record was surpassed in 2018 by Carwyn Jones who served a total of 6,868 days.

She made her first appearance on the back benches on 14 November 2017.

She again returned to the government as Chief Whip on 13 December 2018.

Ministerial roles

Following the Assembly's creation in 1999 she immediately became Health Minister.  She remained in post until January 2005 when she was removed from the position, following strong criticism over long hospital waiting lists. An independent report showed that even though waiting list time targets were higher than in England and Scotland, Hutt had still failed to meet them. As a result, she faced criticism from all the major political parties in Wales, with the strongest coming from within her own party. As a result, her position became untenable, as some became worried that the problems could even damage the case for further Welsh devolution.

She became Minister for Assembly Business and Chief Whip, with additional responsibility for Openness in Government; Communications Strategy; co-ordinating Government policy in relation to children and Equality of Opportunity. In the first Cabinet of the Third Assembly, she was appointed Minister for Budget and Assembly Business (31 May 2007). In the coalition, Cabinet announced on 19 July 2007 she became Minister for Children, Education, Lifelong Learning and Skills.

She left the government during the November 2017 reshuffle, but returned as Chief Whip thirteen months later under new First Minister Mark Drakeford. She is the only MS to have served as a Minister in every Welsh Government to date.

Personal life
In July 1984, Hutt married Labour councillor Michael Trickey. They have two daughters.

References

External links
 Personal website
 Biography at the Welsh Assembly Government
 Profile on BBC website

1949 births
Alumni of the London School of Economics
Alumni of the University of Bristol
Alumni of the University of Kent
People educated at Surbiton High School
Members of South Glamorgan County Council
Living people
Members of the Welsh Assembly Government
School governors
Wales AMs 1999–2003
Wales AMs 2003–2007
Wales AMs 2007–2011
Wales AMs 2011–2016
Wales MSs 2016–2021
Wales MSs 2021–2026
Welsh Labour members of the Senedd
Female members of the Senedd
Ministers for Finance of Wales
Female finance ministers
Politics of the Vale of Glamorgan
20th-century British women politicians
Women members of the Welsh Assembly Government
Women councillors in Wales